On , roughly a month after Russia launched a full-scale invasion of Ukraine, U.S. president Joe Biden delivered a speech at the Royal Castle in Warsaw, Poland.

During the speech, he framed the military struggle in Ukraine as a fight between autocracy and democracy, and confirmed that under NATO's Article 5, the troops of NATO have "a sacred obligation ... to defend each and every inch of NATO territory with the full force of our collective power".  He also praised the "brave and stiff Ukrainian resistance" and "the generosity of ... the Polish people", while making it clear that "the Russian people ... are not our enemy".

Near the end of his speech, Biden referred to Russian president Vladimir Putin when he said, "For God's sake, this man cannot remain in power."  A number of world leaders expressed disapproval over this statement.  The Biden administration later stated that these words had not been part of the prepared speech, and that the administration was not proposing a regime change.  This remark overshadowed the rest of Biden's speech.

About 11 months later, Biden returned to Warsaw to deliver another speech, in which he reiterated that the current conflict was a fight between democracy and autocracy, and reaffirmed NATO's commitment to Article 5.

Background 

German chancellor Olaf Scholz, who held the rotating presidency of the G7 that year, invited the other G7 leaders to a summit to be held on the same day in Brussels.

In March, U.S. president Joe Biden flew to Europe and attended all three meetings in person. Afterward, Biden continued on to Poland, where he spoke to U.S. troops, conferred with Polish president Andrzej Duda, and met with humanitarian aid workers and Ukrainian refugees. After seeing the refugees gathered at Warsaw's Stadion Narodowy ('national stadium'), when asked what he thought of Russian president Vladimir Putin, Biden said, "He's a butcher."

Biden had spoken in Warsaw previously, at the University of Warsaw in 1997 when he was a U.S. senator.  His earlier speech had discussed issues regarding Poland's request to join NATO.

Speech 

Biden delivered his speech from the inner courtyard of the Royal Castle. Biden opened his speech with a reference to Pope John Paul II and his message to "[b]e not afraid". The speech also paid tribute to Lech Wałęsa, leader of the Solidarity movement during the 1980s.

Biden then compared the Russian invasion of Ukraine with events during the time of the Soviet Union, describing them all as part of a struggle between autocracy and democracy, and warned that there was still a "long fight ahead".  He asserted that "the battle for democracy ... did not conclude with the end of the Cold War", and that Russia was "strangl[ing] democracy", both domestically and abroad.  He then reaffirmed the commitment that NATO members had made under Article 5, calling it "a sacred obligation ... to defend each and every inch of NATO territory with the full force of our collective power".

Biden also stated that the invading Russians had met "brave and stiff Ukrainian resistance", contrary to Putin's expectations.  Biden also mentioned that he was "struck by the generosity of ... the Polish people" in their efforts to help Ukrainian refugees.  Biden also reached out to the Russian people, stating that "the Russian people ... are not our enemy", and telling them that "this war is not worthy of you".

Biden then listed three points that he said the invasion had made clear: (1) Europe must end its reliance on Russian fossil fuels, (2) corruption in the Kremlin must be rooted out, and (3) democracies of the world must unite in a fight against autocracy.  Biden described the last point, the fight against autocracy, as "the task of our time ... [t]he task of this generation".

Near the end of his speech, immediately before he said his farewells, Biden referred to Putin when he stated, "For God's sake, this man cannot remain in power."  This statement appeared to conflict with previously established U.S. policy, which had not advocated for a regime change.  A Biden administration official stated that this remark was not part of the prepared speech.  Minutes after the speech ended, the administration had already begun walking back the president's words.  One of Biden's officials stated that Biden had meant that "Putin cannot be allowed to exercise power over his neighbors or the region", and that Biden was not referring to Putin's exercise of power in Russia.

Reactions 

In reference to Biden's final remarks, Kremlin press secretary Dmitry Peskov stated, "This is not to be decided by Mr. Biden.  It should only be a choice of the people of the Russian Federation."  Peskov denounced the use of "[p]ersonal insults like this", and stated that "[a] state leader should control his temper".  Russian billionaire Oleg Deripaska stated that Biden's speech hinted at the start of some form of "hellish ideological mobilisation" that could prolong the invasion.

French president Emmanuel Macron stated that he would not have chosen to use Biden's words during an already precarious situation, and added that his own goal was to "achiev[e] first a ceasefire and then the total withdrawal of [Russian] troops by diplomatic means".  U.K. education minister Nadhim Zahawi called it "a very powerful speech" and added that he thought "both the US and the UK agree that it's up to the Russian people to decide who should be governing them".  İbrahim Kalın, adviser to the Turkish president, stated, "We have to create an environment in which every country ... feel[s] safe enough in the international order that they do not resort to any kind of disruptive action."

The nine-word comment that Biden ad-libbed at the end of his speech distracted from the rest of his strong message.  Aaron David Miller, senior fellow at the Carnegie Endowment for International Peace, observed that Biden's "one-liner ... drown[ed] out the intent of the speech [as] that's exactly what people are focusing on", and described the remark as "a gaffe from the heart".  Richard Haass, president of the Council on Foreign Relations, stated that Biden's words would lower the chances of finding a compromise with Putin, and that although the administration backpedalled from the statement within minutes, "[t]he problem is, from Putin's point of view the president revealed his and our true intentions".

Aftermath 

Nearly a year later, and days before the anniversary of the start of Russia's full-scale invasion, Biden returned to Warsaw's Royal Castle to deliver another speech, which reiterated his point that the world was witnessing a battle between autocracy and democracy, and that the members of NATO would defend "every inch of NATO territory".  The speech was made a day after Biden paid a visit to Kyiv, his first to Ukraine during the invasion, and was delivered hours after Putin had given his own Presidential Address to the Federal Assembly at Gostiny Dvor in Moscow, in which he announced that Russia was suspending its participation in the nuclear disarmament treaty New START.

See also 

  2017 Donald Trump speech in Warsaw
  2022 Zeitenwende speech, delivered by German chancellor Olaf Scholz days after the invasion began
  2022 Moscow rally, held about a week before Biden's speech
 Government-organized demonstration

Notes

References

External links 

 Transcript on whitehouse.gov

2020s in Warsaw
2022 in Poland
2022 speeches
Events in Warsaw
2022 in Warsaw